Vladimir Kolev (born April 18, 1954) is a retired boxer from Bulgaria and Olympic bronze medalist. He also works as an actor, and has appeared in many American films.

At the 1976 Summer Olympics in Montreal, Quebec, Canada, he won the bronze medal in the light welterweight division (– 63'5 kg) after being defeated in the semifinals by eventual runner-up Andrés Aldama of Cuba.

Two years earlier, at the inaugural 1974 World Championships in Havana, Cuba, he won the silver medal, after losing to Ayub Kalule from Uganda in the final.

References
 databaseOlympics

1954 births
Living people
Light-welterweight boxers
Boxers at the 1972 Summer Olympics
Boxers at the 1976 Summer Olympics
Olympic boxers of Bulgaria
Olympic bronze medalists for Bulgaria
Olympic medalists in boxing
Bulgarian male boxers
AIBA World Boxing Championships medalists
Medalists at the 1976 Summer Olympics
Sportspeople from Sofia
20th-century Bulgarian people